Barabbas is a 1961 religious epic film directed by Richard Fleischer, expanding on the career of Barabbas, from the Christian Passion narrative in the Gospel of Mark and other gospels. The film stars Anthony Quinn as Barabbas, features Silvana Mangano, Katy Jurado, Arthur Kennedy, Harry Andrews, Ernest Borgnine, Vittorio Gassman, and Jack Palance, and was distributed by Columbia Pictures. It was conceived as a grand Roman epic, was based on Nobel Prize-winning Pär Lagerkvist's 1950 novel of the same title. A previous film version of the novel, in Swedish, had been made in 1953.

The film was directed by Richard Fleischer and shot in Verona and Rome under the supervision of producer Dino De Laurentiis. It included many spectacular scenes, including a battle of gladiators in a Cinecittà film studio mock-up of the arena, and a crucifixion shot during an actual total solar eclipse.

Plot

Pontius Pilate offers to release either Jesus of Nazareth or Barabbas, in keeping with the Passover custom. The crowd gathered for the pardoning chooses Barabbas, and Jesus is condemned to crucifixion, while Barabbas is set free. Returning to his friends, Barabbas asks for his lover, Rachel. His friends inform him that Rachel has become a follower of Christ. Rachel soon returns, but she is not happy to see Barabbas.

Barabbas witnesses the crucifixion of Jesus. As Jesus dies, the sky turns black, and Barabbas is shaken. He watches Christ's body sealed in the tomb. On the third morning, Barabbas finds the tomb open. Rachel tells him that Christ has risen, but Barabbas says it is an illusion or his followers have stolen the body. He visits the apostles; they do not know where he is, but also believe he is risen.

Rachel preaches in Jerusalem about Christ Jesus himself and is stoned to death at the insistence of the priests. Barabbas, guilt-ridden, returns to his criminal ways and tries to rob a caravan transporting several of the priests. When the robbery goes bad, Barabbas does not try to flee, and he is captured by Roman soldiers. The law forbids Pilate from executing someone who has previously been pardoned, so he sentences Barabbas to lifelong slavery in the sulfur mines of Sicily.

Barabbas survives this hellish existence for the next twenty years.  He is chained to Sahak, a Christian sailor who was sent to the mines for allowing slaves to escape. Sahak at first hates Barabbas for being pardoned instead of "the Master", but the two men eventually become friends. Over time, Sahak becomes too weak to work. As the guards are about to kill him, the mine is destroyed in an earthquake, with Sahak and Barabbas the only survivors. Julia, the superstitious wife of the local prefect, considers them blessed. The prefect is due to leave for Rome, having been appointed to the Senate. Julia insists that Barabbas and Sahak accompany him for good luck.

Once in Rome, the men are trained to become gladiators by Torvald, the top gladiator in Rome. After a gladiatorial event, Sahak is overheard sharing his faith with other gladiators, and is condemned to death for treason. When a squad deliberately miss throwing their spears, Torvald executes Sahak. The next day, Torvald and Barabbas battle in the arena. Barabbas wins, killing Torvald and impressing Emperor Nero, who sets him free. Barabbas takes Sahak's corpse to the catacombs, where the local Christians are worshiping. They give him a proper burial.

Barabbas becomes lost in the catacombs. When he eventually emerges, Rome is on fire. Barabbas is told that the Christians started the fire. Believing that the end of the world has come (as Rachel and Sahak had taught), Barabbas sets fire to more buildings. He is confronted by Roman soldiers and tells them that he is a follower of Christ. He is imprisoned with several other Christians, among them the apostle Peter. Peter admonishes Barabbas for committing arson, informing him that Christians would not do such a thing.  Afterwards, the Christians are executed by mass crucifixion in the persecutions that follow the fire. Having finally placed his faith in Christ, Barabbas is crucified with the others.

Cast

 Anthony Quinn as Barabbas
 Arthur Kennedy as Pontius Pilate
 Jack Palance as Torvald
 Silvana Mangano as Rachel
 Harry Andrews as Peter
 Ernest Borgnine as Lucius
 Katy Jurado as Sara
 Vittorio Gassman as Sahak
 Norman Wooland as Rufio
 Valentina Cortese as Julia
 Arnoldo Foa' as Joseph of Arimathea
 Michael Gwynn as Lazarus
 Laurence Payne as Disciple
 Douglas Fowley as Vasasio
 Guido Celano as Scorpio
 Enrico Glori
 Carlo Giustini as Officer
 Gianni di Benedetto as Officer
 Robert Hall as Commander of Gladiators
 Rina Braido as Tavern Reveler
 Nando Angelini
 Tullio Tomadoni as Blind Man
 Joe Robinson as Gladiator
 Frederich Ledebur as Officer
 Marcello Di Martire
 Spartaco Nale as Overseer
 Maria Zanoli as Beggar Woman
 Gustavo De Nardo
 Vladimiro Picciafuochi

Uncredited
 Roy Mangano as Jesus Christ
 Paola Pitagora as Mary Magdalene
 Rina Franchetti as Mary of Clopas
 Piero Pastore as Nicodemus
 Vera Drudi as Salome
 Nino Segurini as Apostle John
 Jacopo Tecchi as Apostle Thomas
 Ivan Triesault as Emperor Nero
 Sharon Tate as Patrician in arena

Before major casting began, Yul Brynner was actively considered for the title role, yet never got the part. His previous Biblical film roles were The Pharaoh in The Ten Commandments and Solomon in Solomon and Sheba.

Production

The music score by Mario Nascimbene, which was conducted by Franco Ferrara, the noted conductor and lecturer on conducting at several famous international academies, was noted for its unusual, stark experimental component – the composer referred to his work, which included the introduction of electronic sounds achieved by the manipulation of tape speeds,  as  "new sounds". The main theme was based on the "Kyrie" from "Orbis Factor:Missa XI" which is a part of the Roman Catholic Ordinary.  The depiction of the crucifixion was filmed on 15 February 1961 during an actual total eclipse of the sun.

Differences from the book
In Lagerkvist's original novel, Barabbas' later crime that sends him into slavery is explicitly left vague. He is sent to the copper mines of Cyprus, rather than Sicily as in the film. Sarak and Barabbas are freed from the mines by an overseer friendly to Christians, rather than it being destroyed by an earthquake. There are no gladiatorial scenes anywhere in the book, as Barabbas is made a field slave and then a house slave to his Roman owner.

Reception
Barabbas received positive reviews; it currently holds an 89% approval rating on Rotten Tomatoes, based on 9 reviews with an average rating of 6.8/10.

Awards
Nominee Best Color Cinematography - Italian National Syndicate of Film Journalists (Aldo Tonti)
Nominee Best Costume Design - Italian National Syndicate of Film Journalists (Maria De Matteis)
Nominee Best Production Design - Italian National Syndicate of Film Journalists (Mario Chiari)
Selected Top Foreign Films of the Year - National Board of Review

See also

 1961 in film
 Italian films of 1961
 List of films featuring eclipses

References

External links

 
 
 
 

1961 films
1960s adventure drama films
Italian adventure drama films
Columbia Pictures films
1960s English-language films
English-language Italian films
Films directed by Richard Fleischer
Films scored by Mario Nascimbene
Films based on Swedish novels
Films based on the Gospels
Films set in Sicily
Films set in Rome
Films shot in Rome
Peplum films
Religious epic films
Cultural depictions of Pontius Pilate
Depictions of Nero on film
Portrayals of Jesus in film
Sword and sandal films
Cultural depictions of Saint Peter
1961 drama films
Films with screenplays by Nigel Balchin
1960s Italian films
Barabbas